Potassium hexafluorocuprate(III) is an inorganic compound with the chemical formula K3CuF6. It is a green paramagnetic solid, a relatively rare example of a copper(III) compound.

Synthesis and structure
The compound is prepared by oxidizing the mixture of potassium chloride and cuprous chloride with fluorine: 
3 KCl + CuCl + 3 F2   →    K3CuF6  +  2 Cl2
A variety of analogues are known. The compound reacts with water easily, producing oxygen and copper(II) products.

See also
Cuprate(III)
caesium hexafluorocuprate(IV)

References

Copper compounds
Potassium compounds
Fluoro complexes
Metal halides
Fluorometallates